Angela Stanton-King (born February 19, 1977) is an American author, television personality, convicted felon, and right wing speaker based in Atlanta, Georgia. She spent two years in prison for conspiracy and was later pardoned by President Donald Trump a decade after serving her sentence. She was the Republican candidate for Georgia's 5th congressional district in the 2020 election, losing to Democrat Nikema Williams after receiving 14.9% of the vote.

She has been described as a conspiracy theorist for her support of QAnon, which espouses a number of far-right conspiracy theories.

Early life 
Stanton-King was born in Cheverly, Maryland, and grew up in Buffalo, New York. As a child, she also lived in Greensboro, North Carolina,before moving to Atlanta, Georgia as a young adult.

After serving her prison sentence, she met Alveda King, niece of Martin Luther King Jr., while seeking assistance.

Conviction and presidential pardon
In 2004, Stanton-King was convicted on federal conspiracy charges for her role in a car theft ring and served two years in prison. She gave birth to a daughter while serving her sentence. Stanton-King was pardoned by President Donald Trump in February 2020.

After her release from prison, Stanton-King became an author (at first under the name Angela Stanton) and a reality show star. She wrote and edited a number of independently published autobiographical books, one of which led to a legal dispute with The Real Housewives of Atlanta star Phaedra Parks suing her for $30 million. She has also appeared on the BET television program From the Bottom Up.

Politics
On March 6, 2020, Stanton-King officially launched a campaign to challenge incumbent Representative John Lewis for Georgia's 5th congressional district in the 2020 United States House of Representatives elections. She won the Republican primary in an uncontested race, with polls indicating Lewis was a heavy favorite in the general election. Lewis died from pancreatic cancer on July 17, 2020, and was replaced on the ballot by Nikema Williams, state senator and chair of the Georgia Democratic Party.

On November 3, 2020, Stanton-King was defeated by Williams in a landslide victory for the Democrats, receiving 14.9% of the vote compared to 85.1% received by Williams.

Stanton-King is part of a coalition of Black supporters of Donald Trump. Stanton-King attended an event at the White House in February 2020 alongside Donald Trump to celebrate Black History Month. She supported the First Step Act, which outlawed the handcuffing of women during childbirth. While in prison in 2004, she says she was shackled while giving birth, and that her daughter was “snatched from [her] arms 24 hours later”.

She supports the right to vote for anyone released after a felony conviction.

Stanton-King tweeted in support of the 2021 Myanmar coup d'etat, and indicated her support for a military coup in the United States against President Joe Biden.  

Stanton-King has made several anti-LGBTQ statements on Twitter, including comparing the LGBTQ rights movement to pedophilia. She has said that she does not support that child is transgender. Stanton-King appeared on Dr. Phil to discuss her relationship with her child. Stanton-King subsequently threatened to assault transgender advocate Ashlee Marie Preston, who was also invited onto the program. Stanton-King was subsequently banned from Twitter for those threats.

Support for QAnon 
Stanton-King has repeatedly tweeted QAnon slogans and a number of baseless claims. In October 2020, she stormed out of an on-camera interview with The Guardian when asked about her support of the conspiracy theory. At the 2021 Conservative Political Action Conference, she said she supported investigations into certain QAnon claims.

See also
List of people granted executive clemency by Donald Trump

References

External links

1977 births
21st-century American criminals
African-American women in politics
African-American women writers
American prisoners and detainees
Georgia (U.S. state) Republicans
Living people
People from Atlanta
People from Buffalo, New York
People from Cheverly, Maryland
Politicians from Atlanta
Recipients of American presidential pardons
Candidates in the 2020 United States elections
American conspiracy theorists
Participants in American reality television series
QAnon
21st-century American women
21st-century African-American women
21st-century African-American politicians
21st-century American politicians
20th-century African-American people
20th-century African-American women
Criminals by crime
Criminals by ethnicity
American female criminals